Kabbenur is a village in Dharwad district of Karnataka, India.

Demographics 
As of the 2011 Census of India there were 451 households in Kabbenur and a total population of 2,384 consisting of 1,186 males and 1,198 females. There were 310 children ages 0-6.

References

Villages in Dharwad district